A 1996 report Central Intelligence Agency action in Guatemala by the Intelligence Oversight Board mentioned that the United States helped stop a military coup in 1993, further stating that:

The report goes on to state:

The report also goes on to highlight:

Reception 

The report was generally welcomed by interested parties as a first-step but criticized for its limited scope. A Joint statement by 20 NGOs, including Amnesty International USA said the report focused only on cases in which U.S. citizens or their relatives were the victims and ignored cases prior to 1984. It called for full publication of the report and further declassification of documents.

References 

Central Intelligence Agency
Defense Intelligence Agency
Reports of the United States government